Damasta can refer to the following places in Greece:

 Damasta, Heraklion, a village in Heraklion regional unit, Crete
 Damasta sabotage, 1944
 Damasta, Phthiotis, a community in the Gorgopotamos municipal unit